Mohammad Javad Kolivand (Persian: محمد جواد کولیوند born 1967, Tuyserkan, Iran) is an Iranian politician. He served as a member of the ninth and tenth terms of the Islamic Parliament of Iran. He is the former chairman of the Councils and Internal Affairs Commission of the Islamic Parliament of Iran. Javad is the former Deputy Governor General of Tehran and former Director General of Property at Foreign Ministry. He was former Deputy Minister of Interior for Parliamentary Affairs.

References 

Living people
Iranian political people
Year of birth missing (living people)